Drew Buie (born July 12, 1947) is a former American football wide receiver. He played for the Oakland Raiders from 1969 to 1971 and for the Cincinnati Bengals in 1972.

References

1947 births
Living people
American football wide receivers
Catawba Indians football players
Oakland Raiders players
Cincinnati Bengals players
Jacksonville Sharks (WFL) players